Eneda Tarifa (born 31 March 1982) is an Albanian singer, actress and television host. She represented Albania in the Eurovision Song Contest 2016, after winning the 54th edition of Festivali i Këngës.

Life and career 

Tarifa was born in Tirana, Albania on 30 March 1982.  She began her career in 2001, participating in Kënga Magjike with the song "Ika larg". In 2003, she participated at Festivali i Këngës 42 with the song "Qëndroj", and managed to qualify to the final. In 2006, Tarifa took part in Kënga Magjike with the song "Rreth zjarrit tënd", and finished 4th in the competition with 154 points. She was also awarded the Çesk Zadeja Prize. The following year, Tarifa took part in Festivali i Këngës 46 with the song "E para letër". In the final, she was awarded 11 points and placed tenth out of seventeen. In 2008, she participated in Kënga Magjike again with the song "Zëri im" and earned 577 points. In 2010, she competed in Top Fest 2010 with the song "Me veten". She went on to win the competition, and later worked as a host on the television program Portokalli on Top Channel for many years.

After a hiatus, Tarifa returned to Festivali i Këngës in 2015 with the song "Përrallë". She went on to win the competition, representing Albania in the Eurovision Song Contest 2016 in Stockholm, Sweden. She performed her song on May 12, 2016, on the second semi-final of the competition, but didn't make it to the final.

In 2018, she was a judge on The Voice Kids Albania 2 with Ledion Liço being the host and the other judges being Miriam Cani and Aleksandër & Renis Gjoka (duo). In January 2019 announced that she will present the second season of Top Talent in Top Channel.

Personal life 

Tarifa is married to musician Erjon Zaloshnja. In 2013, they had a daughter together named Aria.

Discography

Singles

As lead artist

References 

1982 births
Living people
Musicians from Tirana
21st-century Albanian women singers
Albanian women television presenters
Festivali i Këngës winners
Kënga Magjike winners
Eurovision Song Contest entrants for Albania
Eurovision Song Contest entrants of 2016